Everod Carter (born 14 August 1947) is an Antiguan cricketer. He played in three first-class matches for the Leeward Islands from 1971 to 1975.

See also
 List of Leeward Islands first-class cricketers

References

External links
 

1947 births
Living people
Antigua and Barbuda cricketers
Leeward Islands cricketers